Laura Agard (born 26 July 1989) is a French professional footballer who plays as a centre back for Italian Serie A club Fiorentina.

Honours

Club
Montpellier
Coupe de France Féminine: Winner (2007, 2009) 
Lyon
Division 1 Féminine: Winner 2012–13
Coupe de France Féminine: Winner (2013)
UEFA Women's Champions League: Winner 2013
International Women's Club Championship:  Winner  2012

International 
 France at the 2015 Summer Universiade 
 Gold medal.

References

External links
 
 
 
 
 Laura Agard profile, on statsfootofeminin.fr
 Montpellier player profile
 
 

Living people
1989 births
Montpellier HSC (women) players
French women's footballers
Women's association football defenders
Division 1 Féminine players
French expatriate women's footballers
Fiorentina Women's F.C. players
Olympique Lyonnais Féminin players
A.C. Milan Women players
Expatriate women's footballers in Italy
Serie A (women's football) players
French expatriate sportspeople in Italy